Siphesihle Elwin Mkhize (born 5 February 1999) is a South African soccer player who plays as a midfielder for Chippa United.

References

1999 births
Living people
South African soccer players
South Africa youth international soccer players
Association football midfielders
National First Division players
Mamelodi Sundowns F.C. players
Cape Town Spurs F.C. players
Chippa United F.C. players
South Africa under-20 international soccer players